Ablekuma North is one of the constituencies represented in the Parliament of Ghana. It elects one Member of Parliament (MP) by the first past the post system of election. Ablekuma North is located in the Accra Metropolis in the Greater Accra Region of Ghana.

Boundaries
The constituency is located within the Ga East District of the Greater Accra Region of Ghana.

Members of Parliament

Elections

See also
List of Ghana Parliament constituencies

References

Electoral Commission of Ghana
Adam Carr's Election Archives
Ghana Home Page

Parliamentary constituencies in the Greater Accra Region